Aigun (Manchu:  aihūn hoton) was a historic Chinese town in northern Manchuria, situated on the right bank of the Amur River, some  south (downstream) from the central urban area of Heihe (which is across the Amur from the mouth of the Zeya River and Blagoveschensk).

The Chinese name of the town, which literally means "Bright Jade", is a transliteration of the Manchu (or Ducher) name of the town.

Today the former city of Aigun is called Aihui Town and is part of Aihui District, which in turn is part of the prefecture-level city of Heihe. Heihe is one of the major cities in Heilongjiang Province.

History

The predecessor of Aigun was a town of the indigenous Ducher people of the Amur Valley, located on the left (northeastern - now Russian) bank of the Amur River. The site of this town, whose name was reported by the Russian explorer Yerofey Khabarov as Aytyun in 1652, is currently known to archaeologists as the Grodekovo site, after the nearby village of Grodekovo. It is thought to have been populated since  around the end of the 1st or the beginning of the 2nd millennium AD.

Some sources report a Chinese presence on the middle Amur – a fort existed at Aigun for about 20 years during the Yongle era on the left (northwestern) shore of the Amur downstream from the mouth of the Zeya River. This Ming Dynasty Aigun was located on the opposite bank to the later Aigun that was relocated during the Qing Dynasty.

The Ducher town was probably vacated when the Duchers were evacuated by the Manchu Chinese Qing Dynasty to the Sungari or Hurka in the mid-1650s. In 1683-85 the Manchus re-used the site as a base for their campaign against the Russian fort of Albazin.

The new site occupied the location of the former village of a Daurian chief named Tolga. The city became known primarily under its Manchu name Saghalien Ula hoton (Manchu:  sahaliyan ula hoton), and sometimes also under the Chinese translation of this name, Heilongjiang Cheng. Both names mean "Black River City", but by the 19th century the name "Aigun" again became more current in the western languages.

For a number of years after 1683, Aigun served as the capital (the seat of the Military Governor) of Heilongjiang Province, until the capital was moved to Nenjiang (Mergen) in 1690, and later to Qiqihar. Aigun, however, remained the seat of the Deputy Lieutenant-General (Fu dutong), responsible for a large district covering much of the Amur Valley within the province of Heilongjiang as it existed in those days.

As a part of a nationwide Sino-French cartographic program, Aigun (or, rather, Saghalien Ula hoton) was visited ca. 1709 by the Jesuits Jean-Baptiste Régis, Pierre Jartoux, and Xavier Ehrenbert Fridelli, who found it a well-defended town, serving as the base of a Manchu river fleet controlling the Amur River region. Surrounded by numerous villages on the fertile riverside plain, the town was well provisioned with foodstuffs.

It was at Aigun in May 1858 that Nikolay Muravyov concluded the Aigun Treaty, according to which the left bank of the Amur River was conceded to Russia.

During the Boxer Rebellion of 1900, for a few weeks Aigun was the center of military action directed against the Russians. On July22, Aigun was captured by Russian troops.

In 1913 Aigun became the county seat of the newly created Aigun County (Àihuī Xiàn), which was renamed Aihui County (Àihuī Xiàn, the pronunciation remained unchanged) in December 1956.

The Manchus of the Chinese capital Peking (now known as Beijing) were influenced by the Chinese dialect spoken in the area to the point where pronouncing Manchu sounds was hard for them, and they pronounced Manchu according to Chinese phonetics, while in contrast, the Manchus of Aigun could both pronounce Manchu sounds properly and mimick the sinicised pronunciation of Peking Manchus, since they learned the Pekinese pronunciation from either studying in Peking or from officials sent to Aigun from the capital, and they could tell them apart, using the Chinese influenced Pekinese pronunciation when demonstrating that they were better educated or their superior stature in society.

On November15, 1980, Heihe City was created, and on June6, 1983, Aihui County was abolished and merged into the Heihe City.

Commemoration
There are a number of historical sites in today's Aihui Town (30 km south of downtown Heihe) related to the historical Aigun. They include Aihui Ancient City, Aihui Heroic Defenders' of the Fatherland Garden (Àihuī Wèiguó Yīngxióng Yuán), and Aihui History Museum (Àihuī Lìshǐ Chénliè Guǎn).

References

Township-level divisions of Heilongjiang
Populated places established in 1684
Boxer Rebellion
Geography of Heilongjiang
1684 establishments in China
Major National Historical and Cultural Sites in Heilongjiang